KTSM-FM (99.9 MHz, "Sunny 99.9") is a commercial radio station in El Paso, Texas.  It airs an adult contemporary radio format and is owned by iHeartMedia, Inc.  The studios and offices are on North Mesa Street (Texas State Highway 20) in West Central El Paso.  Evenings feature the syndicated Delilah call-in and request show.  On Sunday mornings, Dave Koz hosts a smooth jazz show.  The rest of the schedule features local DJs.

The transmitter is located off Scenic Drive in El Paso, in the Franklin Mountains, at one of the highest sites in the state of Texas.  The signal covers parts of Texas, New Mexico and the Mexican state of Chihuahua.  KTSM-FM has an effective radiated power (ERP) of 87,000 watts (100,000 with beam tilt).  The station broadcasts in the HD Radio hybrid format.  Its HD2 subchannel airs an oldies format known as "The Beatles and Friends."

History
On June 18, 1962, KTSM-FM first signed on.  It was the FM counterpart to AM 1380 KTSM, owned by the Tri-State Broadcasting Company.  Tri-State referred to the states of Texas, New Mexico and Chihuahua.  From the start, KTSM-FM was programmed separately from the AM station's middle of the road format.  KTSM-FM aired beautiful music, fifteen minute sweeps of instrumental cover versions of popular songs with minimal talk and news.

Over time, some vocals were added to the playlist.  At first it was a few per hour.  But as the station saw its audience's age increase, it made a move to give the station a younger feel by including some softer vocal songs from the Top 40.  By 1990, the station had eliminated the easy listening instrumentals, completing its evolution to soft adult contemporary music.  Some hours, it made use of the Transtar Radio Networks' "Format 41," a satellite-delivered soft AC service.

In 1998, San Antonio-based Clear Channel Communications bought KTSM-AM-FM as well as AM 690 KHEY and 96.3 KHEY-FM.  Clear Channel had already acquired 102.1 KPRR in 1996.  Under Clear Channel management, KTSM-FM increased the tempo of its playlist, transitioning to a mainstream AC sound.  In 2014, Clear Channel changed its name to iHeartMedia, Inc.

References

External links
KTSM-FM official website

TSM-FM
Radio stations established in 1962
1962 establishments in Texas
IHeartMedia radio stations
Mainstream adult contemporary radio stations in the United States